This is a '''list of universities in Ivory Coast.

Universities in Ivory Coast
British institute of management and technology (IBM-T)
British University- UCL Abidjan
Catholic University of West Africa (CUWA / UCAO)
Centre d'animation et de formation pédagogique de Yamoussoukro
Centre International de Formation à Distance (CIFAD)
Centre universitaire professionnalisé d'Abidjan
Ecole de Spécialité Multimédia d'Abidjan
 (ENSEA)
Ecole Normale Superieure (ENS)
Ecole Supérieure Africaine des Technologies de l'Information et de la Communication (ESATIC)
Graduate School of Management (GSM), Abidjan
HEC Abidjan
Institut National de la Jeunesse et des sports (INJS)
Institut Nationale des Arts et de l'Action Culturelle (INSAAC)
Institut National Polytechnique Félix Houphouët-Boigny (Yamoussoukro) (INPHB)
Institut Pedagogique National de l'Enseignement Technique et Professionnel (IPNETP)
Institut Supérieur de Commerce et Administration des Entreprises de Yamoussoukro (ISCAE)
Institut Supérieur de Technologie de Côte d'Ivoire (ISTCI)
Institut Supérieur de Technologie Dubass (IST-DUBASS)
Institut Supérieur des Carrières Commerciales (ISCC)

International University of Grand-Bassam (IUGB)
Jean Lorougnon Guédé University
 (formerly  Groupe Pigier)
Pôle Universitaire Canadien d'Afrique de l'Ouest 
The University of Abidjan
Université Tertiaire et Technologique LOKO
Université Alassane Ouattara (Bouaké)
Université d'Abobo-Adjamé
Université Félix Houphouët-Boigny

Université Nouvelle de Côte d'Ivoire (UNCI University)
Université Pelefero Gon Coulibaly (Korhogo)
University of Science and Technology of Ivory Coast (USTCI)

References

External links
Universities in Côte d'Ivoire

List
Ivory Coast
Ivory Coast
Universities